Rajgarh is a city and a municipality in the state of Madhya Pradesh in India. It is the administrative headquarters of Rajgarh District, and was a princely state under the British Raj, named Rajgarh State. The old city belongs to the Malwa region and is surrounded by a battlemented wall. Rajgarh is now known for NTPC solar power plant and dam projects running over here, as a result companies like Tata and Reliance power have shown interest.Rajgarh is also famous for Jalpama temple

Geography
Rajgarh district is located in the northern part of Malwa Plateau & Rajgarh is almost in the middle of the district. It forms the North Western part of Division of Bhopal Commissioner. Rajgarh District extends between the parallels of Latitude 23027' 12" North and 24017' 20" North and between the meridians of Longitude 76011' 15" and 77014' East. It has a Quadrangular shape with the Northern and Western sides longer than the Southern and Eastern sides respectively. The zigzag boundaries of the District resemble a pear. Rajgarh District is bounded by Shajapur District in the South as well as west. The District of Sehore, Bhopal, Guna and Jhalawar (Rajasthan) enclose it from the South-East, East, North-East, and North directions respectively. The total Geographical area of the District is 6,154 km2. with a population of 1,545,814 according to census 2011.  It is one of the small districts of Madhya Pradesh both in respect of area and population. It is about 145 km north-west from the state capital Bhopal & 198 km from Indore which is the commercial capital as well as largest city of Madhya Pradesh.

Climate

Demographics

As of the 2011 Census of India, Rajgarh had a population of 29,726. Males constitute 52% of the population and females 48%. Rajgarh has an average literacy rate of 70%, higher than the national average of 59.5%: male literacy is 78%, and female literacy is 61%. In Rajgarh, 14% of the population is under 6 years of age.

Schools
 Kendriya Vidyalaya, Rajgarh
 Govt. Excellence School, Rajgarh
 Govt. Post Graduation College, Rajgarh
 Rajeshwar Convent School, Rajgarh
 Swami Vivekanand Public School, Rajgarh
 Bhartiya Vidhya Mandir School, Rajgarh
 Deepak Public School, Rajgarh
 Career Convent Public School, Rajgarh
 K. K. College Of Science & Management, Rajgarh
 Sarswati Shishu Mandir, Rajgarh
 Unix Computer College, Rajgarh
Advance Computer Academy, Rajgarh

References
2. http://www.ndtv.com/india-news/digital-india-techies-bring-free-wi-fi-to-madhya-pradesh-villages-1265877

3. http://www.news18.com/news/india/four-it-youths-bring-free-wi-fi-to-three-remote-villages-in-mp-1187910.html

4.http://www.thebetterindia.com/42226/engineers-shivnathpura-village-council-free-wifi-mp/

5. http://www.financialexpress.com/economy/dream-of-digital-rajgarh/204970/

6. http://mashable.com/2016/01/11/free-wifi-indian-villages/

 
Former capital cities in India

de:Rajgarh